Dean Schifilliti (born 30 March 1968) is an Australian former professional rugby league footballer who played in the 1980s, 1990s and 2000s.

Background
Born and raised in Ingham, Queensland, Schifilliti is of Italian descent and played his junior rugby league for Herbert River. While playing for Herbert River's Foley Shield side, he was signed by the Illawarra Steelers.

Playing career

Illawarra Steelers
In Round 1 of the 1989 NSWRL season, Schifilliti made his first grade debut in Illawarra's 18–22 loss to the St George Dragons, scoring two tries. In his rookie season for the Steelers, he played 21 games, starting 14 at hooker, scoring five tries. In 1990, he started all 22 of Illawarra's games at hooker, scoring six tries, and in 1991, took over as captain of the club. In 1992, he captained the Steelers' to their first finals appearances, with the club coming within one game of the Grand Final. 

In 1993, Schifilliti signed with the North Queensland Cowboys, who were set to enter the competition in 1995, becoming the club's first major signing. He played 16 games for the Steelers that year but after signing with the Cowboys, would lose the captaincy and finish the season in reserve grade.

South Sydney Rabbitohs
In 1994, Schifilliti joined the South Sydney Rabbitohs in the interim and achieved success early, captaining the side in their pre-season Tooheys Challenge Cup final win over the Brisbane Broncos. Schifilliti played just six games for the Rabbitohs after suffering a knee injury.

North Queensland Cowboys
In 1995, Schifilliti recovered from his knee injury, passing a late fitness test to start at hooker in the Cowboys inaugural game against the Sydney Bulldogs. Unfortunately, 24 minutes into the game, he re-injured his knee and would be ruled out for the rest of the 1995 season. In January 1996, Schifilliti represented Italy at the Super League World Nines in Suva, Fiji.

Adelaide Rams
In 1997, Schifilliti joined the Adelaide Rams after being granted a release by the Cowboys. After two injury riddled seasons, he played two full seasons with the Rams, playing 35 games for the club. In 1998, he played 21 games, playing mostly at lock, and scoring a try in the club's final game, a 20–34 loss to the Newcastle Knights.

Parramatta Eels
In 1999, Schifilliti's return to form saw him sign with the Parramatta Eels after the Rams had folded. He played 20 games for the Eels that season, starting all at hooker, including their two finals games. In 2000, he played 10 games before retiring at the end of the season.

Achievements and accolades

Individual
Illawarra Steelers 25th Anniversary Team of Steel

Statistics

NSWRL/ARL/Super League/NRL

Post-playing career
In 2006, Schifilliti was named at lock in the Illawarra Steelers 25th Anniversary Team of Steel. Since 2018, the Dean Schifilliti Shield has been played in Ingham, featuring under-8's sides from around north Queensland.

References

1968 births
Living people
Australian people of Italian descent
Australian rugby league players
Illawarra Steelers players
South Sydney Rabbitohs players
North Queensland Cowboys players
Adelaide Rams players
Parramatta Eels players
South Sydney Rabbitohs captains
Rugby league halfbacks
Rugby league hookers
Rugby league players from Queensland